This is a list of flag bearers who have represented North Korea at the Olympics.

Flag bearers carry the national flag of their country at the opening ceremony of the Olympic Games.

Notes

See also
North Korea at the Olympics

References

North Korea at the Olympics
North Korea
Olympic flagbearers
Olympic flagbearers